The Lewis and Clark Bridge is a historic bridge in Wolf Point, Montana, which once carried Montana Highway 13 across the Missouri River between McCone and Roosevelt counties. It is also known as Wolf Point Bridge, Missouri River Bridge, or Site No. 24RV438. Completed in 1930 by the Missouri Valley Bridge and Iron Company, the bridge was the first bridge across the Missouri River at Wolf Point and the only bridge along the river for a  stretch. The bridge's opening ceremony, which took place on July 9, drew over 10,000 visitors and included five bands and a fireworks display. After its completion, the bridge became a popular tourist attraction for motorists in northeastern Montana and a point of civic pride for Wolf Point's residents.

The bridge was listed on the National Register of Historic Places on November 24, 1997.

It spans between McCone and Roosevelt counties.

See also
List of bridges documented by the Historic American Engineering Record in Montana
List of bridges on the National Register of Historic Places in Montana

References

External links

Steel bridges in the United States
Bridges completed in 1930
Road bridges on the National Register of Historic Places in Montana
Transportation in Roosevelt County, Montana
Historic American Engineering Record in Montana
National Register of Historic Places in McCone County, Montana
National Register of Historic Places in Roosevelt County, Montana
Pennsylvania truss bridges in the United States
1930 establishments in Montana
Bridges over the Missouri River
Transportation in McCone County, Montana